Love Coma is a Christian rock/alternative group in the early 1990s based in the San Antonio area of Texas. The group disbanded in 1997 following the bankruptcy of its record label.

Critics have compared the band's sound to that of Simple Minds and The Mission UK, and band members cite other influences such as The Waterboys and The 77s. The Dallas Morning News, reviewing the album Language of Fools, wrote that the music is "[s]mart and subtle, seductive even."

In 2019, the band reformed to begin work on their first album in over two decades. The result, Love Coma, was released on October 26, 2020.

Members 

 Chris Dodds – drums 
 Matt Slocum – guitar 
 Chris Taylor – lead vocals
 Chris Mattingly – lead guitar
 Jeff Duncan – bass guitar
 TJ Behling – bass guitar
 Matt Odom – bass guitar
 Curtis Saunier – bass guitar

Discography
Soul Rash (1993)
Language of Fools (R.E.X. Records, 1996)

References

Christian rock groups from Texas
Musical groups from San Antonio
Musical groups from Austin, Texas
Musical groups disestablished in 1997
Musical groups established in the 1990s
1990s establishments in Texas